Brabner is a surname. Notable people with the surname include:

 Joyce Brabner (born 1952), American writer of political comics
 Rupert Brabner (1911–1945), British politician and war pilot